Kotha ganesunipadu is a village in Palnadu district of the Indian state of Andhra Pradesh. It is located in  machavaram mandal of Guntur revenue division.

References 

Villages in Palnadu district